The Norwegian Maritime Museum is located at Bygdøynesveien on the Bygdøy peninsula, on the western side of Oslo, Norway. The Norwegian Maritime Museum  is situated near several other museums, including the Fram Museum; the Kon-Tiki Museum; the Norwegian Museum of Cultural History; and the Viking Ship Museum. The Norwegian Maritime Museum is operated in conjunction with Norwegian Folk Museum.

Overview
The museum was founded in 1914 and previously known as the Norsk Sjøfartsmuseum. The exhibits on coast culture and maritime history cover a number of subjects including ship building, boat models, fishing, marine archeology, and shipping. The video "Maritime Norway" by Ivo Caprino and a library are also a part of the museum experience. Additionally the museum has a marine archaeological department. The museum also displays a collection of  more than 40 maritime paintings by notable artists.

Ships
The  Stavanger and the  Svanen  are on display.  The Stavanger was designed by Colin Archer for the Norwegian Society for Sea Rescue. The three-masted schooner Svanen was built during the winter of 1915–1916 and saw service with the Norwegian merchant fleet.

From 1972, the  Gjøa was displayed in the Norwegian Maritime Museum. The  ship was the first vessel to transit the Northwest Passage in the 1903–06 Arctic expedition of Roald Amundsen.  In 2009, the Norwegian Maritime Museum and the Fram Museum signed an agreement for the Fram Museum to take over the exhibition of the Gjøa. It is currently displayed in a separate building at Fram Museum.

Notable past directors
 Gunnar Isachsen
 Per G. Norseng

Gallery

References

External links
 Norwegian Maritime Museum – Official site

Bygdøy
Maritime museums in Norway
Museums in Oslo
1914 establishments in Norway